The Street of Sin (1928) is an American silent film directed by Mauritz Stiller. It starred Emil Jannings, Fay Wray and Olga Baclanova. It was distributed by Paramount Pictures.

Preservation status
The film is now considered a lost film.

Cast
Olga Baclanova as Annie
Emil Jannings as "Basher" Bill
Fay Wray as Elizabeth
Ernest W. Johnson as Mr. Smith
George Kotsonaros as Iron Mike
John Gough as Crony of Basher Bill
Johnnie Morris as Crony of Basher Bill
 John Burdette as Publican

See also
List of lost films

References

External links
Street of Sin at IMDB
Street of Sin at AllMovie.com
Street of Sin, lantern slide plate
Street of Sin lobby poster

1928 films
American silent feature films
Films directed by Mauritz Stiller
Lost American films
Famous Players-Lasky films
Films directed by Ludwig Berger
1928 drama films
Silent American drama films
American black-and-white films
1928 lost films
Lost drama films
Films set in London
1920s American films